AMC-6, formerly GE-6, is a commercial broadcast communications satellite owned by SES S.A. Launched on 21 October 2000, from Baikonur Cosmodrome in Kazakhstan, AMC-6 became the fifth hybrid C-band / Ku-band satellite in the GE Americom fleet. The satellite provides coverage to the continental United States, Canada, the Caribbean islands, southern Greenland, and Latin America. Located in a geostationary orbit parallel to the eastern United States coastline, AMC-6 provides service to commercial and government customers, and is used as an Internet platform due to its wide coverage, scale and redundancy. Some of its capabilities include Very-small-aperture terminal (VSAT) networking, satellite news gathering and Ku-band transceiver service. Launched as GE-6, it was renamed AMC-6 when SES took over GE Americom in 2001, forming SES Americom. This merged with SES New Skies in 2009 to form SES World Skies.

Rainbow 2 
Rainbow Media announced in November 2004, that it will utilize 16 transponders on the AMC-6 satellite, which VOOM refers to as Rainbow 2.

References

External links 
 AMC-6 website
 
 
 

Communications satellites in geostationary orbit
Satellite television
Spacecraft launched in 2000
SES satellites
AMC-06